Alhárabe is a river in Spain. It is a tributary of Segura.

See also 
 List of rivers of Spain

References

Rivers of Spain
Rivers of the Valencian Community